The men's 200 metres event  at the 2002 European Athletics Indoor Championships was held on March 1–2.

Medalists

Results

Heats
The winner of each heat (Q) and the next 7 fastest (q) qualified for the semifinals.

Semifinals
First 2 of each semifinal qualified directly (Q) for the final.

Final

References
Results

200 metres at the European Athletics Indoor Championships
2002 European Athletics Indoor Championships